Bost Motorsports is a former NASCAR Busch Series team. It was owned by Danny Bost and driven by a variety of drivers.

The team made its debut in 2002, originally a splinter of Bickford Racing. Running the No. 34, Daniel Johnson started 35th but finished 40th due to oil pressure problems. Carl Edwards also made his Busch Series debut for Bost at Gateway, driving the No. 9 Waterloo Tool Storage Chevy to a 38th-place run after suffering valve problems.

Jeff Fuller began 2003 with the team, qualifying 41st and finishing 24th. Rookie Regan Smith then signed a contract to finish out the year with Bost, posting three top-twenty finishes. He skipped the Aaron's 312 as he did not obtain a license from NASCAR, with Tina Gordon driving to a tenth-place run instead. After the Winn-Dixie 250, Smith resigned from the then unsponsored ride. His best finish to that date had been a 15th at Texas, the only top-15 for the team that did not come at a superspeedway. Justin Ashburn, Wayne Edwards, Brian Tyler, Jeff Streeter, Dana White, Phil Bonifield, Bill Hoff, Blake Mallory, and Jerry Reary shared the ride for the rest of the season. Of these replacement drivers, the best finish would be a 23rd ar IRP by Tyler in a one-off race. They would fail to qualify twice in their singular season, at Charlotte and Rockingham.

After Reary failed to qualify for the penultimate Target House 200, the team disappeared and then shut down. Bost has not re-appeared in any capacity in NASCAR since this event either, nor has he maintained any presence online for racing or otherwise.

References

External links 
Danny Bost - NASCAR Owner
Danny Bost Ownership Statistics

2002 establishments in the United States
Defunct NASCAR teams
American auto racing teams